Bhutan(Nepali: भुटन) or commonly known as Khasiko Bhutan in Nepali Language is a spicy  dish prepared with goat tripe and other digestive parts that has been stir-fried in a wok or a frying pan with other ingredients like shallots, onions, tomatoes, garlic with other herbs and condiments. It also includes Liver and kidneys. The Newari Cuisine variety uses Buffalo's digestive organs instead of goat. It is often eaten during Dashain and in monsoon usually accompanied with soft drinks or alcohol. Nowadays, the dish is a staple  on restaurant menus and one of the most popular fast foods in Nepal.

See also
 List of goat dishes
 Nepalese cuisine
 Newari cuisine

References

Goat dishes